Musatov is a Russian masculine surname, its feminine counterpart is Musatova. It may refer to
Aleksei Musatov (1980–2005), Russian football player
Igor Musatov (born 1987), Russian ice hockey winger
Ivan Musatov (born 1976), Russian politician, son of Mikhail
Mikhail Musatov (born 1950), Russian politician, father of Ivan
Victor Borisov-Musatov (1870–1905), Russian painter

Russian-language surnames